Algidiella is a monotypic genus of spiders in the family Anapidae. It was first described by Rix & Harvey in 2010. , it contains only one species, Algidiella aucklandica.

References

Anapidae
Monotypic Araneomorphae genera
Spiders of New Zealand
Fauna of the Auckland Islands